Iseult Lynch is an Irish chemist and Professor of Enivornmental Nanoscience at the School of Geography, Earth and Environmental Sciences at the University of Birmingham. Her research focuses on the safety of nanoparticles in the environment and their interactions with biological entities.

Early life and education 
Lynch is from Dublin,Ireland. She completed a BSc in Chemistry in 1995, a PhD in Physical Chemistry in 2000 and went on to complete an MBA in 2012, all at University College Dublin.

Career 
She worked in the Irish Centre for Colloid Science and Biomaterials before moving to the University of Birmingham. Her work centres on nanoplastics, which range in size from 1 - 100 nanometers (nm), and microplastics.

She specialises in the environmental health and safety implications of engineering nanomaterials and nanoscale plastic waste. She has investigated the impact of water pollution on daphnia (also known as water fleas), specifically looking at how these plastics enter their gut. Her research has demonstrated that daphnia release proteins that attach in a process known as adsorption, which changes how organisms interact with the nanoplastics.

Awards 

 Royal Society of Chemistry John Jeyes Award 2020
 Clarivate Highly Cited Researcher in 2018
 Clarivate Highly Cited Researcher in 2022

Selected publications

References

External links

Living people
Irish emigrants to the United Kingdom
Irish chemists
Irish women chemists
Academics of the University of Birmingham
Year of birth missing (living people)